Love @ Seventeen is a 2016 Taiwanese romantic television series created and produced by Eastern Television. Starring Lego Lee, Nikki Hsieh, Edison Wang, Amanda Chou and Alina Cheng as the main cast, filming began on February 2, 2016 and wrapped up on June 15, 2016. The initial broadcast began on April 9, 2016 on TTV airing every Saturday night at 10:00-11:30 pm.

Cast

Main cast
Lego Lee as He Hao Yi 何皓一
 as Ai Li Si 艾麗絲
 as Song Han Ming 宋翰明
Amanda Chou as Bai Shu Lei 白舒蕾
 as Liu Xiao Fen 劉曉芬

Supporting cast
Snoop Yu 余晉 as Chen Qi Tai 陳起泰
 as  Zhao Gu Yi 趙古意
Wish Chu as Lin Jun Xiong 林俊雄
 as Sha Sha 莎莎
 as Juan Mao 捲毛
 as Zhou Ji Mi 周吉米（Jimmy）

Cameos
 as Hao Yi and Xiao Fen's father 
 as Hao Yi and Xiao Fen's mother  
 as Li Si's mother
 as Bai Guo Dong 白國棟
Liao Li-ling 廖梨伶 as Teacher Ye
Tu Kai-hsiang 涂凱祥 as Xu Ming De 徐明德
 as Zhang Jiao Guan 張教官
 as Wang Bai Jun 王柏鈞
 as Ya Li 雅莉 

?? as Mr. Hunter
Li You-ju 李又汝 as Manager
Lin Hsiu-chin 林秀琴 as Sister Chen 
 as Director Wang 
?? as Tony
 as Brother De

Soundtrack

Love @ Seventeen Original TV Soundtrack (OST) (我和我的十七歲 電視原聲帶) was released on June 30, 2016 by various artists under Seed Music Co.,Ltd. It contains 15 tracks total, in which 10 songs are various versions of the original songs. The opening theme is track 1 " My Only Love" by Alan Ko 柯有倫 feat. Min-Chen 林明禎, while the closing theme is track 2 "A Better Tomorrow 以後以後" by Shennio Lin 林芯儀.

Track listing

Songs not featured on the official soundtrack album.
Mid-Session Interval by Dark Captain Light Captain
First Dance 第一支舞 by Zhou Bing Jun 周秉鈞 & Yang Hai-Wei 楊海薇

Broadcast

Episode ratings
Competing shows on rival channels airing at the same time slot were:
CTS - Genius Go Go Go
FTV - Just Dance
CTV - Mr. Player

References

External links
Love @ Seventeen TTV Website 
Love @ Seventeen EBC Website  
 

2016 Taiwanese television series debuts
2016 Taiwanese television series endings
Eastern Television original programming
Taiwan Television original programming